SN 2004GT was a type Ic supernova that happened in the interacting galaxy NGC 4038 on December 12, 2004. The event occurred in a region of condensed matter in the western spiral arm. The progenitor was not identified from older images of the galaxy, and is either a type WC Wolf-Rayet star with a mass over 40 times that of the Sun, or a star 20 to 40 times as massive as the Sun in a binary star system.

References

External links
 Light curves and spectra on the Open Supernova Catalog
 Simbad

Supernova remnants
Supernovae
Corvus (constellation)
20041212